Ceratias tentaculatus, commonly known as the southern seadevil, is a species of sea devil, a type of anglerfish. It is endemic to the Southern Hemisphere.

References

Ceratiidae
Deep sea fish
Fish described in 1930
Taxa named by John Roxborough Norman